The Syrian Cup is Syria's premier knockout Cup tournament in men's football. It was first contested in 1959. Al-Ittihad SC has won the competition on 10 occasions. The final was first played in the 1960-61 season during the UAR era and won by Al-Majd SC. The tournament has been held annually since then except for the 1963, 1972, 1974, 1975, 1976 and 1977 seasons.

The record for consecutive wins in the competition is four titles, only two teams have achieved such as Al-Karamah and Al-Fotuwa. Al-Ittihad are the current title holders.

List of finals

This is a list of finals contested from 1959–60 onward:

Notes:
  The Winner and Runner-up of 1960–61 Syrian Cup qualified for United Arab Republic Cup.
 Al-Ittihad SC Aleppo was also known as Al-Ahly Aleppo.

Performances

Performance by club

Performance by city

Medals
Each club in the final receives 30 winners or runners-up medals to be distributed among players, staff, and officials.

Records
The record for most wins of the tournament by a club is 10, held by Al-Ittihad. 

Three clubs have won consecutive Syrian Cups on more than two occasions: Al-Karamah, Al-Wahda and Al-Fotuwa.

Five clubs have won the Syrian Cup as part of a League and Cup double, namely Al-Shorta, Al-Jaish, Al-Karamah, Al-Fotuwa and Al-Hurriya.

See also
 Syrian Premier League
 Syrian Super Cup

References

External links
 Cup at futbol24.com

 
Syria
Recurring sporting events established in 1959
1950s establishments in Syria